Silakhor District is a district (bakhsh) in Dorud County, Lorestan Province, Iran. At the 2006 census, its population was 14,896, in 3,679 families.  The District has one city: Chalanchulan. The District is subdivided into two Rural Districts: Chalanchulan Rural District and Silakhor Rural District.

References 

Districts of Lorestan Province
Dorud County